In the Chicago mayoral election of 1846, Whig nominee John P. Chapin defeated Democratic nominee Charles Follansbee and Liberty nominee Philo Carpenter by a landslide 22 point margin.

Campaign

Follansbee, a former Chicago alderman from the 1st ward, failed to garner the support of Irish Democrats, an important constituency for the Democratic Party in Chicago. These voters rejected him because he was a champion of the "Native American  Act", which would require a period of 21 years of residency before any immigrant could become a naturalized citizen.

Chapin was also a former alderman from the 1st ward.

General election

References

Mayoral elections in Chicago
Chicago
Chicago
1840s in Chicago